Finance Director (Navy), according to gov.uk, is responsible for management and decision support relating to Navy Command's delegated budget; delivery of the programming function and Portfolio Office; implementation of civilian HR policy and representation of civilian workforce dimensions in strategic decision making; conduct of ministerial and parliamentary business, corporate communications and management of the Command Secretariat.

Current Finance Director (Navy) 
Since 24 January 2019, Nick Donlevy has been the Finance Director (Navy)

Since March 2017, Donlevy has also served in HM Treasury as the Deputy Director, Health and Social Care. He graduated from Oxford University in 2003 with a Bachelor of Arts (Hons) in Philosophy, Politics and Economics.

Before his appointment, Second Sea Lord Tony Radakin said 'I look forward to welcoming Nick and working with him over the coming months as we continue to work towards delivering the Navy's transformation programme and proposition.’

References 

Royal Navy appointments